Whitehall School District (WSD) is a school district based in Whitehall, Wisconsin.  it has about 700 students in all grades, and has elementary and high school levels.

Mike Beighly began as superintendent in 2003.

To deal with the COVID-19 pandemic in Wisconsin the district enacted live video and co-op models so the district could continue doing in-person instruction.

References

External links
Whitehall School District
School districts in Wisconsin
Education in Trempealeau County, Wisconsin